Isaac Henry Lionberger (August 30, 1854 – September 12, 1948) was a well-known St. Louis lawyer who later became Assistant Attorney General of the United States. His house was designed by
Henry Hobson Richardson. He attended Princeton University, where he was captain of the 1874 football team.

References

External links
 

1854 births
1948 deaths
19th-century players of American football
American lawyers
Princeton Tigers football players
Players of American football from St. Louis